Cladonia digitata, commonly known as the finger cup lichen, is a cup lichen species in the family Cladoniaceae.

Description 
Cladonia digitata is a fruticose lichen found mainly in northern Eurasia and North America. It grows mainly on rotten wood, but also grows in rich soils or living plants.

The primary thallus is  composed of large or medium-sized squamules, 2–15 mm. long, involute or somewhat flat and sometimes sorediate at the margin or below. The podetia arise from the surface of the primary thallus, around 10-15mm. long. The lower part is .5–4 mm. in diameter and cylindrical or often incrassate below the cups. Its proliferation is either simple or repeated; The upper part and especially the cups are sorediate and the cavity corticate. The lower part or sometimes the entire podetium is covered with a continuous cortex, without squamules. The cups are medium-sized, 10–15 mm. in diameter and 2–5 mm. high. The margin is commonly somewhat incurved, sub-entire, dentate radiate or proliferate. The ascoma are apothecial, apothecioid or hymenial. The apothecium, reddish in color, is usually medium-sized, or rarely small, .5-5mm. in diameter. They are located at the apices of the branches or rarely on the margin of the cups, are either simple or clustered and either convex or immarginate. 
The paraphyses are simple or rarely branched, and are somewhat enlarged toward the apex. The asci are cylindrico-clavate 
The asci are lecanoralean, with a thickened tholus. There are normally 8 ascospores.

Biochemistry 
Among the secondary metabolites are bellidiflorin, thamnolic acid (which has shown use as an antimicrobial agent), decarboxythamnolic acid and the red pigment rhodocladonic acid.

References 

 , Deutschl. Fl., Zweiter Theil (Erlangen): 124 (1796)
USDA Plant Database
North American Lichen Checklist
List of British Lichens & Lichenicolous Fungi
 
 
 
 , Guide des fougères, mousses et lichens d'Europe, Delachaux et Niestlé , (1989).

Links to photos 
  Cladonia digitata
  - Cladonia digitata
 Cladonia digitata
  (photo by M. Sutcliffe) Cladonia digitata

External links 
 
 

digitata
Lichen species
Lichens described in 1796
Taxa named by Georg Franz Hoffmann